The United States order of precedence is an advisory document maintained by the Ceremonials Division of the Office of the Chief of Protocol of the United States which lists the ceremonial order, or relative preeminence, for domestic and foreign government officials (military and civilian) at diplomatic, ceremonial, and social events within the United States and abroad. The list is used to mitigate miscommunication and embarrassment in diplomacy, and offer a distinct and concrete spectrum of preeminence for ceremonies. Often the document is used to advise diplomatic and ceremonial event planners on seating charts and order of introduction. Former presidents, vice presidents, first ladies, second ladies, and secretaries of state and retired Supreme Court justices are also included in the list.

The order is established by the president, through the Office of the Chief of Staff, and is maintained by the State Department's Office of the Chief of Protocol.  It is only used to indicate ceremonial protocol and has no legal standing; it does not reflect the presidential line of succession or the co-equal status of the branches of government under the Constitution. The Office of the Chief of Protocol posted an updated order of precedence in February 2022.

Details as of  
Except as otherwise noted, positions in the list are from the following source.

President of the United States (Joe Biden)
Vice President of the United States (Kamala Harris)
Governor of a state – when in own state
Speaker of the House of Representatives (Kevin McCarthy)
Chief Justice of the United States (John Roberts)
Former presidents of the United States or their widows/widowers (by seniority of assuming office):
Jimmy Carter (January 20, 1977 – January 20, 1981)
Bill Clinton (January 20, 1993 – January 20, 2001)
George W. Bush (January 20, 2001 – January 20, 2009)
Barack Obama (January 20, 2009 – January 20, 2017)
Donald Trump (January 20, 2017 – January 20, 2021)
Former vice presidents of the United States or their widows/widowers (by seniority of assuming office):
Dan Quayle (January 20, 1989 – January 20, 1993)
Al Gore (January 20, 1993 – January 20, 2001)
Dick Cheney (January 20, 2001 – January 20, 2009)
Mike Pence (January 20, 2017 – January 20, 2021)
American ambassadors extraordinary and plenipotentiary to foreign governments – when at post
American ambassadors, permanent representatives or representatives to international organizations who hold chief of mission authority – when at post
American chargé d'affaires ad interim – when at post
Secretary of State (Antony Blinken)
President, United Nations General Assembly – when in session (Csaba Kőrösi)
Secretary-General of the United Nations – when at the United Nations (António Guterres)
President, United Nations General Assembly – when not in session
Ambassadors extraordinary and plenipotentiary of foreign diplomatic missions to the United States (in order of presentation of credentials to the President of the United States)
Associate justices of the Supreme Court (ranked by date of appointment):
Clarence Thomas (October 18, 1991)
Samuel Alito (January 31, 2006)
Sonia Sotomayor (August 8, 2009)
Elena Kagan (August 7, 2010)
Neil Gorsuch (April 8, 2017)
Brett Kavanaugh (October 6, 2018)
Amy Coney Barrett (October 27, 2020)
Ketanji Brown Jackson (June 30, 2022)
Retired chief justices of the United States (ranked by date of appointment; currently none)
Retired associate justices of the Supreme Court, unless they resigned (ranked by date of appointment):
Sandra Day O'Connor (September 25, 1981 – January 31, 2006)
Anthony Kennedy (February 18, 1988 – July 31, 2018)
David Souter (October 9, 1990 – June 29, 2009)
Stephen Breyer (August 3, 1994 – June 30, 2022)
The Cabinet (other than Secretary of State), ranked according to the date of establishment of the department, as added by the president, as follows:
Secretary of the Treasury (Janet Yellen)
Secretary of Defense (Lloyd Austin)
Attorney General (Merrick Garland)
Secretary of the Interior (Deb Haaland)
Secretary of Agriculture (Tom Vilsack)
Secretary of Commerce (Gina Raimondo)
Secretary of Labor (Marty Walsh)
Secretary of Health and Human Services (Xavier Becerra)
Secretary of Housing and Urban Development (Marcia Fudge)
Secretary of Transportation (Pete Buttigieg)
Secretary of Energy (Jennifer Granholm)
Secretary of Education (Miguel Cardona)
Secretary of Veterans Affairs (Denis McDonough)
Secretary of Homeland Security (Alejandro Mayorkas)
White House chief of staff (Jeff Zients)
Administrator, Environmental Protection Agency (Michael S. Regan)
Director, Office of Management and Budget (Shalanda Young)
Director of National Intelligence (Avril Haines)
United States trade representative (Katherine Tai)
Ambassador to the United Nations (Linda Thomas-Greenfield)
Chair of the Council of Economic Advisers (Cecilia Rouse)
Administrator, Small Business Administration (Isabel Guzman)
Presidential Science Advisor and Director of the Office of Science and Technology Policy (Arati Prabhakar)
President pro tempore of the U.S. Senate (Patty Murray)
Senate majority leader (Chuck Schumer)
Senate minority leader (Mitch McConnell)
Senate majority whip (Dick Durbin)
Senate minority whip (John Thune)
Senators (by length of service; if the same, by the state's date of admission into the Union or alphabetically by state)
Governors of states – when outside their own states (relative precedence among governors, all of whom are outside their own state, is determined by each state's date of admission into the Union or alphabetically by state)
Governor of Delaware (John Carney)
Governor of Pennsylvania (Josh Shapiro)
Governor of New Jersey (Phil Murphy)
Governor of Georgia (Brian Kemp)
Governor of Connecticut (Ned Lamont)
Governor of Massachusetts (Maura Healey)
Governor of Maryland (Wes Moore)
Governor of South Carolina (Henry McMaster)
Governor of New Hampshire (Chris Sununu)
Governor of Virginia (Glenn Youngkin)
Governor of New York (Kathy Hochul)
Governor of North Carolina (Roy Cooper)
Governor of Rhode Island (Daniel McKee)
Governor of Vermont (Phil Scott)
Governor of Kentucky (Andy Beshear)
Governor of Tennessee (Bill Lee)
Governor of Ohio (Mike DeWine)
Governor of Louisiana (John Bel Edwards)
Governor of Indiana (Eric Holcomb)
Governor of Mississippi (Tate Reeves)
Governor of Illinois (J. B. Pritzker)
Governor of Alabama (Kay Ivey)
Governor of Maine (Janet Mills)
Governor of Missouri (Mike Parson)
Governor of Arkansas (Sarah Huckabee Sanders)
Governor of Michigan (Gretchen Whitmer)
Governor of Florida (Ron DeSantis)
Governor of Texas (Greg Abbott)
Governor of Iowa (Kim Reynolds)
Governor of Wisconsin (Tony Evers)
Governor of California (Gavin Newsom)
Governor of Minnesota (Tim Walz)
Governor of Oregon (Tina Kotek)
Governor of Kansas (Laura Kelly)
Governor of West Virginia (Jim Justice)
Governor of Nevada (Joe Lombardo)
Governor of Nebraska (Jim Pillen)
Governor of Colorado (Jared Polis)
Governor of North Dakota (Doug Burgum)
Governor of South Dakota (Kristi Noem)
Governor of Montana (Greg Gianforte)
Governor of Washington (Jay Inslee)
Governor of Idaho (Brad Little)
Governor of Wyoming (Mark Gordon)
Governor of Utah (Spencer Cox)
Governor of Oklahoma (Kevin Stitt)
Governor of New Mexico (Michelle Lujan Grisham)
Governor of Arizona (Katie Hobbs)
Governor of Alaska (Mike Dunleavy)
Governor of Hawaii (Josh Green)
House majority leader (Steve Scalise)
House minority leader (Hakeem Jeffries)
House majority whip (Tom Emmer)
House minority whip (Katherine Clark)
Members of the House of Representatives (by length of service; if the same, by the states's date of admission into the Union or alphabetically by state)
Delegates or resident commissioners to the House of Representatives (non-voting members) from Territory of American Samoa, District of Columbia, Territory of Guam, Commonwealth of Puerto Rico, and United States Virgin Islands (by length of service)
Eleanor Holmes Norton of the District of Columbia (January 3, 1991)
Amata Coleman Radewagen of American Samoa (January 3, 2015)
Stacey Plaskett of the US Virgin Islands (January 3, 2015)
Jenniffer González of Puerto Rico (January 3, 2017)
James Moylan of Guam (January 3, 2023)
Governors of Commonwealth of Puerto Rico, Territory of Guam, Territory of American Samoa, United States Virgin Islands, and the Commonwealth of the Northern Mariana Islands (ordered by territory's date of entering U.S. jurisdiction or alphabetically by territory):
Governor of Puerto Rico (Pedro Pierluisi)
Governor of Guam (Lou Leon Guerrero)
Governor of American Samoa (Lemanu Peleti Mauga)
Governor of the US Virgin Islands (Albert Bryan)
Governor of the Northern Mariana Islands (Arnold Palacios)
Assistants to the president:
National Security Advisor (Jake Sullivan)
Counselors to the president (ranked by date of appointment):
Steve Ricchetti (January 20, 2021)

White House deputy chiefs of staff (ranked by date of appointment):
Jen O'Malley Dillon (January 20, 2021) 
Bruce Reed (January 20, 2021)
Chief of Staff to the spouse of the president (Vacant)
Chief of Staff to the vice president (Lorraine Voles)
Senior advisors to the president (ordered by appointment):
Mike Donilon (January 20, 2021)
Anita Dunn (January 20, 2021, returned on May 5, 2022)
Neera Tanden (May 17, 2021)
Julie Chávez Rodriguez (June 15, 2022)
Remaining assistants to the president or special presidential envoys who previously held Cabinet rank (ordered by appointment; excluding those already listed above)

Kate Bedingfield (January 20, 2021)
Anthony Bernal (January 20, 2021)
Brian Deese (January 20, 2021)
Anne Filipic (January 20, 2021)
Jonathan Finer (January 20, 2021)
Gina McCarthy (January 20, 2021)
Dana Remus (January 20, 2021)
Susan Rice (January 20, 2021)
Elizabeth Sherwood-Randall (January 20, 2021)
Louisa Terrell (January 20, 2021)
Annie Tomasini (January 20, 2021)
Gautam Raghavan (January 31, 2022)
Karine Jean-Pierre (May 13, 2022)
Lael Brainard (February 21, 2023)
Other counselors to the president (ranked by date of appointment; currently none):
Other senior advisors to the president (ranked by date of appointment):
Gene Sperling (March 15, 2021)
Mitch Landrieu (November 15, 2021)
Keisha Lance Bottoms (June 15, 2022)
John Podesta (September 2, 2022)
Chair of the Council on Environmental Quality (Brenda Mallory)
Director of the Office of National Drug Control Policy (Rahul Gupta)
Chief of Protocol (Rufus Gifford) - when with the president or for a White House event
Ambassadors from the United States to international organizations who do not hold Chief of Mission authority (when at post)
Chargés d'affaires to the United States (ordered by assumption of office)
Former secretaries of state (ordered by term):
Henry Kissinger (September 22, 1973 – January 20, 1977)
James Baker (January 20, 1989 – August 23, 1992)
Condoleezza Rice (January 26, 2005 – January 20, 2009)
Hillary Clinton (January 21, 2009 – February 1, 2013) (note that Hillary Clinton would appear above when in attendance with her husband, former president Bill Clinton)
John Kerry (February 1, 2013 – January 20, 2017)
Rex Tillerson (February 1, 2017 – March 31, 2018)
Mike Pompeo (April 26, 2018 – January 20, 2021)
Former members of the U.S. Cabinet (ordered by term, who don't already rank higher by virtue of another office)
Former U.S. senators (ordered by leadership position, then by term; if same, then by date of statehood or ratification of the Constitution, who don't already rank higher by virtue of another office)
Former governors of the state or territory in which the event is held (ordered by term, who don't already rank higher by virtue of another office)
Former governors (of states other than the state in which the event is held, by date of statehood or ratification of the Constitution, who don't already rank higher by virtue of another office)
Former U.S. representatives (ordered by leadership position, then by term; if same, then by date of statehood or ratification of the Constitution, who don't already rank higher by virtue of another office)
Deputy secretaries of executive departments (in the order of the creation of the respective departments or presidential appointment as for Cabinet above):
Deputy Secretary of State (Wendy Sherman)
Deputy Secretary of State for Management and Resources (John R. Bass) (Acting)
Deputy Secretary of the Treasury (Wally Adeyemo)
Deputy Secretary of Defense (Kathleen Hicks)
Deputy Attorney General (Lisa Monaco)
Deputy Secretary of the Interior (Tommy Beaudreau)
Deputy Secretary of Agriculture (vacant)
Deputy Secretary of Commerce (Don Graves)
Deputy Secretary of Labor (Julie Su)
Deputy Secretary of Health and Human Services (Andrea Palm)
Deputy Secretary of Housing and Urban Development (Adrianne Todman)
Deputy Secretary of Transportation (Polly Trottenberg)
Deputy Secretary of Energy (David Turk)
Deputy Secretary of Education (Cindy Marten)
Deputy Secretary of Veterans Affairs (Donald Remy)
Deputy Secretary of Homeland Security (John Tien)
Deputy Administrator of the Environmental Protection Agency (Janet McCabe)
Deputy Director of the Office of Management and Budget (Nani A. Coloretti)
Principal Deputy Director of National Intelligence (Stacey Dixon)
Deputy trade representatives:
Jayme White
Sarah Bianchi
Maria Pagan
Deputy Ambassador to the United Nations (Rich Mills)
Deputy Administrator of the Small Business Administration (Vacant)
Secretaries of the military departments (by creation order of branch):
Secretary of the Army (Christine Wormuth)
Secretary of the Navy (Carlos Del Toro)
Secretary of the Air Force (Frank Kendall III)
Chairman of the Joint Chiefs of Staff (Mark A. Milley)
Chairman of the Federal Reserve (Jerome Powell)
Commissioner of the Social Security Administration (Kilolo Kijakazi) (Acting)
Heads of independent federal agencies at Level II of the Executive Schedule (ordered by creation date, if same, then by term)
Director of the Central Intelligence Agency (CIA) (William J. Burns)
Director of the National Science Foundation (Sethuraman Panchanathan)
Administrator of the National Aeronautics and Space Administration (Bill Nelson) (also a former U.S. Senator, which ranks higher in precedence)
Administrator of the United States Agency for International Development (Samantha Power)
Chairman of the Administrative Conference of the United States (Andrew Fois)
Chairman of the Nuclear Regulatory Commission (Christopher T. Hanson)
Director of the United States Office of Personnel Management (Kiran Ahuja)
Chief Executive Officer of the Millennium Challenge Corporation (Alice P. Albright)
Director of the Consumer Financial Protection Bureau (Rohit Chopra)
CEO of the U.S. International Development Finance Corporation (Scott Nathan)
Vice-chair and governors of the Federal Reserve (by length of service)
Michelle Bowman
Christopher Waller
Lisa D. Cook
Philip Jefferson
Michael Barr
1 seat vacant
Deputy Commissioner of the Social Security Administration (Vacant)
Deputy Director of the Central Intelligence Agency (David S. Cohen)
Principal Deputy Director of the Office of National Drug Control Policy (Vacant)
Director of the National Counterterrorism Center (Christine Abizaid)
Deputy heads of independent federal agencies at Level II of the Executive Schedule (ordered by creation date, if same, then by term)
Under secretaries of state and departmental positions of equivalent rank (ordered by departmental line of succession)
Under Secretary of State for Political Affairs (Victoria Nuland)
Under Secretary of State for Management (John R. Bass)
Remaining under secretaries of state, ordered by date of appointment:
Counselor of the United States Department of State (Derek Chollet) (January 20, 2021)
Under Secretary of State for Civilian Security, Democracy, and Human Rights (Uzra Zeya) (July 13, 2021)
Under Secretary of State for Arms Control and International Security Affairs (Bonnie Jenkins) (July 21, 2021)
Under Secretary of State for Economic Growth, Energy, and the Environment (Jose W. Fernandez) (August 6, 2021)
Under Secretary of State for Public Diplomacy and Public Affairs (Elizabeth M. Allen) (April 4, 2022) (Acting)
Under secretaries of executive departments and departmental positions of equivalent rank, Treasurer of the United States, associate attorneys general, and Solicitor General (ordered as Cabinet above and then by departmental line of succession)
Heads of federal departmental agencies (ordered as Cabinet above and then as by departmental line of succession). This includes the directors of the Federal Bureau of Investigation, the U.S. Secret Service, the Federal Aviation Administration, and Customs and Border Protection
Former chairs of the Joint Chiefs of Staff (ordered by term)
Hugh Shelton (October 1, 1997 – October 1, 2001)
Richard Myers (October 1, 2001 – October 1, 2005)
Peter Pace (October 1, 2005 – October 1, 2007)
Michael Mullen (October 1, 2007 – October 1, 2011)
Martin Dempsey (October 1, 2011 – October 1, 2015)
Joseph Dunford (October 1, 2015 – October 1, 2019)
Vice Chair of the Joint Chiefs of Staff (Christopher W. Grady)
Joint chiefs of staff (ordered by appointment):
Commandant of the Marine Corps (David H. Berger) (July 11, 2019)
Chief of Staff of the Army (James C. McConville) (August 9, 2019)
Chief of Naval Operations (Michael M. Gilday) (August 22, 2019)
Chief of Staff of the Air Force (Charles Q. Brown Jr.) (August 6, 2020)
Chief of Space Operations (B. Chance Saltzman) (November 2, 2022)
Chief of the National Guard Bureau (Daniel R. Hokanson)
Commandant of the Coast Guard (Linda L. Fagan)
Combatant commanders of the Unified Combatant Commands of four-star grade (ordered by appointment):
Cyber Command (Paul M. Nakasone) (May 4, 2018)
Northern Command (Glen D. VanHerck) (August 20, 2020)
Space Command (James H. Dickinson) (August 20, 2020)
Indo-Pacific Command (John C. Aquilino) (April 30, 2021)
Transportation Command (Jacqueline Van Ovost) (October 15, 2021)
Southern Command (Laura J. Richardson) (October 29, 2021)
Central Command (Michael E. Kurilla) (April 1, 2022)
European Command (Christopher G. Cavoli) (July 1, 2022)
Africa Command (Michael E. Langley) (August 9, 2022)
Special Operations Command (Bryan P. Fenton) (August 30, 2022)
Strategic Command (Anthony J. Cotton) (December 9, 2022)
Heads of independent federal agencies at Level III of the Executive Schedule (ordered by creation date, if same, then by term)
Deputy heads of independent federal agencies at Level III of the Executive Schedule (ordered by creation date, if same, then by term)
Postmaster General (Louis DeJoy)
Lieutenant governor (of the state in which the event is held)
Mayor (of the city in which the event is held)
Heads of international organizations when not at post (ranked by date of establishment)
Ambassadors or permanent representatives of foreign governments accredited to international organizations headquartered in the United States
Ambassadors from the United States to foreign governments (on official business in the United States or another country)
Chief of Protocol (when at the Department of State or at events outside the White House, otherwise appears above)
Ambassadors from the United States to international organizations who hold Chief of Mission authority (on official business in the United States or another country)
Ambassadors from the United States to international organizations who do not hold Chief of Mission authority (on official business in the United States or another country)
Career ambassadors
National Security Council Chief of Staff and Executive Secretary (Yohannes Abraham)
Chief of Staff to the Spouse of the Vice President (Julie Mason)
Deputy Assistants to the President (ordered by appointment)
Executive Secretary of the National Space Council (Chirag Parikh)
Chief judges and circuit judges of the United States Courts of Appeals (by length of service)
Chief judges and district judges of the United States District Courts (by length of service)
Chief Judge and judges of the United States Court of Appeals for the Armed Forces (by length of service)
Kevin A. Ohlson (November 1, 2013)
John E. Sparks (April 19, 2016)
Gregory E. Maggs (January 29, 2018)
Liam P. Hardy (December 8, 2020)
M. Tia Johnson (January 3, 2023)
Chief Judge and judges of the United States Court of Appeals for Veterans Claims (by length of service)
Margaret Bartley (June 28, 2012)
Coral Wong Pietsch (June 28, 2012)
William S. Greenberg (December 28, 2012)
Michael P. Allen (August 3, 2017)
Amanda Meredith (August 3, 2017)
Joseph Toth (August 3, 2017)
Joseph L. Falvey Jr. (May 2018)
Scott J. Laurer (August 2020)
Grant C. Jaquith (September 3, 2020)
Chief Judge and judges of the United States Tax Court (by length of service)
Chargés d'affaires from the United States (ordered by assumption of office)
Under secretaries of the Army, Navy, and Air Force (ordered by date of appointment)
Under Secretary of the Air Force (Gina Ortiz Jones) (July 26, 2021)
Under Secretary of the Army (Gabe Camarillo) (February 8, 2022) 
Under Secretary of the Navy (Erik Raven) (April 13, 2022)
Assistant secretaries (ordered as Cabinet above and then as by departmental line of succession)
Chiefs of staff to heads of executive departments (ordered as Cabinet above and then as by departmental line of succession)
Ambassadors-at-large (ordered as Cabinet above and then as by departmental line of succession)
Special envoys/representatives (ordered as Cabinet above and then as by departmental line of succession)
Assistant attorneys general (ordered by departmental line of succession)
White House Social Secretary (Carlos Elizondo)
Senior directors of the National Security Council
Legal advisers of executive departments (ordered as Cabinet above and then as by departmental line of succession)
Special assistants to the president (ranked by date of appointment)
Heads of independent federal agencies at Level IV of the Executive Schedule (ordered by creation date, if same, then by term)
Director of the Selective Service System (Joel C. Spangenberg) (Acting)
Chairman of the Federal Deposit Insurance Corporation (Martin J. Gruenberg) (Acting)
Chairman of the United States Commission on Civil Rights (Norma V. Cantu)
Chairman of the Postal Regulatory Commission (Michael M. Kubayanda)
President of the Inter-American Foundation (Sara Aviel)
Chairman of the Federal Election Commission (Shana M. Broussard)
Chairman of the Federal Labor Relations Authority (Ernest W. DuBester)
Special Counsel of the Office of Special Counsel (Henry Kerner)
Director of the Court Services and Offender Supervision Agency (Richard S. Tischner)
Chairperson of the Chemical Safety Board (Steve Owens) (Acting)
CEO of the Broadcasting Board of Governors and Director of the International Broadcasting Bureau (Amanda Bennett)
Chairman of the Election Assistance Commission (Donald L. Palmer)
Deputy Director of the Federal Bureau of Investigation (Paul Abbate)
Deputy heads of independent federal agencies at Level IV of the Executive Schedule (ordered by creation date, if same, then by term)
Assistant administrators of the Environmental Protection Agency
Assistant administrators of the United States Agency for International Development
Assistant trade representatives
Associate administrators of the Small Business Administration
Comptroller General of the United States (Gene Dodaro)
Members of the Council of Economic Advisers (ranked alphabetically)
Members of the Council on Environmental Quality (ranked alphabetically)
American ambassadors-designate (in the United States)
Mayors of U.S. cities (when not in own city; if multiple mayors present, rank by length of service)
Mayor of the District of Columbia (Muriel Bowser) (when not in own city)
Mayors of U.S. territories (when not in own city)
Vice chiefs of staff (ordered by appointment):
Vice Chief of Space Operations (David D. Thompson) (October 2, 2020)
Vice Chief of Staff of the Air Force (David W. Allvin) (November 16, 2020)
Assistant Commandant of the Marine Corps (Eric M. Smith) (October 8, 2021)
Vice Chief of Staff of the Army (Randy A. George) (August 5, 2022)
Vice Chief of Naval Operations (Lisa M. Franchetti) (September 2, 2022)
Vice Chief of the National Guard Bureau (Marc H. Sasseville)
Vice Commandant of the Coast Guard (Steven D. Poulin)
Assistant secretaries and general counsels of the Department of the Army, Navy, and Air Force (by date of appointment)
Assistant Secretary of the Navy (Energy, Installations and Environment) (Meredith Berger) (August 5, 2021)
Assistant Secretary of the Army (Financial Management and Comptroller) (Caral Spangler) (August 17, 2021)
Assistant Secretary of the Army (Civil Works) (Michael L. Connor) (November 29, 2021)
General Counsel of the Army (Carrie Ricci) (January 3, 2022)
Assistant Secretary of the Air Force (Acquisition, Technology and Logistics) (Andrew P. Hunter) (February 7, 2022)
Assistant Secretary of the Army for Acquisition, Logistics, and Technology (Douglas R. Bush) (February 11, 2022)
General Counsel of the Navy (Sean Coffey) (February 14, 2022)
General Counsel of the Air Force (Peter Beshar) (March 18, 2022)
Assistant Secretary of the Army (Installations, Energy and Environment) (Rachel Jacobson) (April 4, 2022)
Assistant Secretary of the Air Force (Financial Management & Comptroller) (Kristyn E. Jones) (May 4, 2022)
Assistant Secretary of the Air Force for Space Acquisition and Integration (Frank Calvelli) (May 5, 2022)
Assistant Secretary of the Air Force (Manpower & Reserve Affairs) (Alex Wagner) (June 10, 2022)
Assistant Secretary of the Navy (Financial Management and Comptroller) (Alaleh Jenkins) (January 20, 2021) (Acting)
Assistant Secretary of the Army (Manpower and Reserve Affairs) (Mark R. Lewis) (January 20, 2021) (Acting)
Assistant Secretary of the Navy (Manpower and Reserve Affairs) (Robert D. Hogue) (November 2021) (Acting)
Assistant Secretary of the Air Force (Installations, Environment & Energy) (Edwin Oshiba) (February 2022) (Acting)
Assistant Secretary of the Navy (Research, Development and Acquisition) (Tommy Ross) (May 2022) (Acting)
Four-star military officers (in order of seniority: retired officers rank with but after active-duty officers)
Executive Secretary of the National Security Council (if not listed above)
Officers of the U.S. Senate:
Chaplain (Barry Black)
Secretary for the Majority (Gary B. Myrick)
Secretary for the Minority (Robert M. Duncan)
Secretary of the Senate (Sonceria Berry)
Sergeant at Arms (Karen Gibson)
Parliamentarian (Elizabeth MacDonough)
Officers of the U.S. House of Representatives:
Chaplain (Margaret G. Kibben)
Chief Administrative Officer (Catherine Szpindor)
Clerk of the House (Cheryl L. Johnson)
Sergeant at Arms (William J. Walker) 
Three-star military officers (in order of seniority: retired officers rank with but after active-duty officers)
State senators (when in own state; ranked by length of service, when the same, by alphabetical order by surname)
State representatives (when in own state; ranked by length of service, when the same, by alphabetical order by surname)
Former American ambassadors/chiefs of diplomatic missions (in order of presentation of credentials at first post, who don't already rank higher by virtue of another office)
Chairmen or heads of other federal boards, councils and commissions not previously listed
Librarian of Congress (Carla Hayden)
Secretary of the Smithsonian Institution (Lonnie Bunch)
Chairman of the American Red Cross (Bonnie McElveen-Hunter)
Deputy chiefs of Protocol (ranked by date of appointment)
Minister-rank officials assigned to foreign bilateral diplomatic missions in Washington, D.C.
Deputy under secretaries of executive departments (according to date of establishment of the Department; if more than one from a department, then as ranked within the department)
Principal deputy assistant secretaries of executive departments (according to date of establishment of the department; if more than one from a department, then as ranked within the department)
Deputy counsels of executive departments (according to date of establishment of the department; if more than one from a department, then as ranked within the department)
Two-star military officers (in order of seniority: retired officers rank with but after active-duty officers)
Deputy assistant secretaries of executive departments (according to date of establishment of the department; if more than one from a Department, then as ranked within the department)
Deputy assistant secretaries and deputy general counsels of the Army, Navy and Air Force (by date of appointment)
Directors of the National Security Council
American consuls general to foreign governments (at post)
American deputy chiefs of mission (at post)
Deputy ambassadors or permanent representatives of foreign governments accredited to international organizations headquartered in the United States
Assistant chiefs of protocol
Minister-Counselor-rank officials assigned to foreign diplomatic missions
Chief Judge and judges, United States Court of International Trade (by seniority)
Mark A. Barnett (May 28, 2013) (Chief Judge)
Claire R. Kelly (May 28, 2013)
Jennifer Choe-Groves (June 8, 2016)
Gary Stephen Katzmann (September 15, 2016)
Timothy M. Reif (August 8, 2019)
M. Miller Baker (December 18, 2019)
Stephen Vaden (December 21, 2020)
2 seats vacant
Chief Judge and associate judges, United States Court of Federal Claims (by seniority)
Elaine D. Kaplan (November 6, 2013) (Chief Judge)
Patricia E. Campbell-Smith (September 19, 2013)
Richard Hertling (June 12, 2019)
Ryan T. Holte (July 11, 2019)
David A. Tapp (November 19, 2019)
Matthew H. Solomson (February 3, 2020)
Eleni M. Roumel (February 24, 2020)
Edward H. Meyers (October 20, 2020)
Kathryn C. Davis (December 16, 2020)
Zachary Somers (December 22, 2020)
Thompson Michael Dietz (December 22, 2020)
Stephen S. Schwartz (December 22, 2020)
Armando Bonilla (February 17, 2022)
Carolyn N. Lerner (February 17, 2022)
2 seats vacant
One-star military officers (in order of seniority: retired officers rank with but after active-duty officers)
Directors of offices of executive departments
Consuls general of foreign governments accredited to the United States
Counselor-rank officials assigned to foreign bilateral diplomatic missions in Washington, D.C.
Members of the Senior Executive Service not holding previously listed positions (by date of appointment, unless ranked differently as determined by the respective executive department)
Members of other federal boards, councils, and commissions not previously listed
Desk officers of executive departments
First Secretary-rank officials assigned to foreign bilateral diplomatic missions in Washington, D.C.

Notes

References

Further reading

External links 
 United States Order of Precedence (PDF; 655 KB) from the U.S. State Department website
 Diplomatic List: Order of Precedence and Date of Presentation of Credentials (for foreign diplomats) from the U.S. State Department website

United States
Politics of the United States
Diplomatic protocol